17 Aquarii, abbreviated 17 Aqr, is a spectroscopic binary star system in the constellation of Aquarius. 17 Aquarii is the Flamsteed designation. It appears to the naked eye as a faint sixth magnitude star, having a combined apparent visual magnitude of 5.99. It is moving further away with a heliocentric radial velocity of 18 km/s.

The primary component is an aging giant star with a stellar classification of K4/5 III. It is radiating 495 times the Sun's luminosity from its photosphere at an effective temperature of 3,951 K.

References

K-type giants
Spectroscopic binaries
Aquarius (constellation)
Durchmusterung objects
Aquarii, 017
203525
105574
8175